The 2011–12 Estudiantes Tecos season was the 65th professional season of Mexico's top-flight football league. The season is split into two tournaments—the Torneo Apertura and the Torneo Clausura—each with identical formats and each contested by the same eighteen teams. Estudiantes Tecos began their season on July 22, 2011 against Toluca, Estudiantes tecos play their homes games on Fridays at 8:10pm local time.

On April 14, 2012, Estudiantes Tecos was relegated to the Liga de Ascenso after being last in the relegation percentage table.

Torneo Apertura

Squad

 

 
 *

 *

Regular season

Apertura 2011 results

Estudiantes Tecos did not qualify to the Final Phase

Goalscorers

Results

Results summary

Results by round

Transfers

In

Out

Torneo Clausura

Squad

Regular season

Apertura 2011 results

Estudiantes Tecos did not qualify to the Final Phase

Goalscorers

Results

Results summary

Results by round

References

2011–12 Primera División de México season
Mexican football clubs 2011–12 season